Houde may refer to:

Houde (surname), a French surname
Houde, Togo, a village in Togo
Houde Bimax, a French ultralight aircraft
Houde Engineering, a hydraulic shock absorber manufacturer that became Houdaille Industries
Houde Institute, a Beijing think tank
Houde Speedmax, a French ultralight aircraft